The Central District of Abadan County is a district (bakhsh) in Abadan County, Khuzestan Province, Iran. At the 2006 census, its population was 250,116, in 53,940 families.  The district has two cities: Abadan and Chavibdeh. The district has three rural districts (dehestan): Bahmanshir-e Jonubi Rural District, Bahmanshir-e Shomali Rural District, and Shalahi Rural District.

References 

Abadan County
Districts of Khuzestan Province